Caroline Mary Charles  (born 18 May 1942) is a British fashion designer.

Early life and education
Caroline Mary Charles was born on 18 May 1942, in Cairo, Egypt to British parents, Noel St. John Fairhurst and Helen T. Williams. From a young age she was interested in fashion. She left school at sixteen and studied locally at Swindon Art School from 1958–60.

Career
Charles did an apprenticeship at Michael Sherard's couture house, after which she worked with Mary Quant, and then worked for a year with the photographer Tony Rawlinson.

She started her Caroline Charles label in 1963, aged 21. Charles was one of the leading designers in the explosion of demand in the US during the 1960s for clothes from young British designers. She travelled widely with her Mod designs, visiting 36 cities and arranging fashion and pop shows, and appearing on television in the US and the UK, including the 23 November 1964 episode of To Tell the Truth, in which she was the person whom the celebrity panelists were attempting to identify. Two of the four panelists correctly selected Charles.

Her customers have included Mick Jagger, Ringo Starr, for both of whom she designed clothes, Marianne Faithfull, Diana, Princess of Wales, Cilla Black, Barbra Streisand, Cherie Blair, Anne Robinson, Helena Kennedy and Lesley Garrett. The actress Emma Thompson wore a green-beaded bodice and wide trousers by Caroline Charles, when receiving her Oscar for the 1992 film Howards End.

According to The Guardian, "The beautiful classic cut, high standard of manufacture and quality fabrics are the foundations upon which the label was built". Hilary Alexander, writing in The Daily Telegraph, called her "the thinking woman's designer". Charles was awarded an OBE in June 2002. In 2012, her memoirs, Caroline Charles – 50 years in fashion were published.

As of 2017, the Caroline Charles label has stores in London, Cheltenham, Tunbridge Wells, Wilmslow and Exeter.

Personal life
Charles lives in Knightsbridge, London. She was married to environmentalist Malcolm Valentine from 1960 until his death in 2016. They had a daughter and a son, Kate and Alex.

References

External links

1942 births
Living people
British fashion designers
Officers of the Order of the British Empire